Feodosia (Feodosiia, Teodosiia; , Feodosiya), also called in English Theodosia (from ), is a port and resort, a town of regional significance in the Crimea on the coast of the Black Sea. Feodosia serves as the administrative center of Feodosia Municipality, one of the regions into which the Crimea is divided. During much of its history, the city was known as Caffa (Ligurian: Cafà; Crimean Tatar and ) or Kaffa. According to the most recent census, in 2014, its population was

History

Theodosia (Greek colony)

The city was founded as Theodosia (Θεοδοσία) by Greek colonists from Miletos in the 6th century BC. Noted for its rich agricultural lands, on which its trade depended, the city was destroyed by the Huns in the 4th century AD.

Theodosia remained a minor village for much of the next nine hundred years. It was at times part of the sphere of influence of the Khazars (excavations have revealed Khazar artifacts dating back to the 9th century) and of the Byzantine Empire.

Like the rest of Crimea, this place (village) fell under the domination of the Kipchaks and was conquered by the Mongols in the 1230s.

A settlement named Kaphâs (alternate romanized spelling Cafâs) existed surrounding Theodosia prior to the penetration of Genoese into the Black Sea. The archaeological evidence indicates that during the Middle Ages the population about Theodosia never decreased to zero; several medieval churches are found in the area dating from the times of Late Antiquity/Early Middle Ages. However, the population had become completely agrarian. A small local Greek population must have existed in situ and in the neighboring settlements. Likely, from the 9th century there were Cumans and Goths living alongside the Greeks, and by 1270s, perhaps some Tatars and Armenians as well.

Kaffa (Genoese colony)

In the late 13th century, traders from the Republic of Genoa arrived and purchased the city from the ruling Golden Horde. They established a flourishing trading settlement called Kaffa, which virtually monopolized trade in the Black Sea region and served as a major port and administrative center for the Genoese settlements around the Sea. It came to house one of Europe's biggest slave markets. The Great Soviet Encyclopedia also adds that the city of Caffa was established during the times when the area was ruled by the Khan of the Golden Horde Mengu-Timur.

Ibn Battuta visited the city, noting it was a "great city along the sea coast inhabited by Christians, most of them Genoese." He further stated, "We went down to its port, where we saw a wonderful harbor with about two hundred vessels in it, both ships of war and trading vessels, small and large, for it is one of the world's celebrated ports."

In early 1318 Pope John XXII established a Latin Church diocese of Kaffa, as a suffragan of Genoa. The papal bull of appointment of the first bishop attributed to him a vast territory: "a villa de Varna in Bulgaria usque Sarey inclusive in longitudinem et a mari Pontico usque ad terram Ruthenorum in latitudinem" ("from the city of Varna in Bulgaria to Sarey inclusive in longitude, and from the Black Sea to the land of the Ruthenians in latitude"). The first bishop was Fra' Gerolamo, who had already been consecrated seven years before as a missionary bishop ad partes Tartarorum. The diocese ended as a residential bishopric with the capture of the city by the Ottomans in 1475. Accordingly, Kaffa is today listed by the Catholic Church as a titular see. The new diocese effectively broke up the diocese of Khanbaliq,  which functioned as one diocese for all Mongol territory from the Balkans to China.

It is believed that the devastating pandemic of the Black Death entered Europe for the first time via Kaffa in 1347, through the movements of the Golden Horde. After a protracted siege during which the Mongol army under Janibeg was reportedly withering from the disease, they catapulted the infected corpses over the city walls, infecting the inhabitants, in one of the first cases of biological warfare. Fleeing inhabitants may have carried the disease back to Italy, causing its spread across Europe. However, the plague appears to have spread in a stepwise fashion, taking over a year to reach Europe from Crimea. Also, there were a number of Crimean ports under Mongol control, so it is unlikely that Kaffa was the only source of plague-infested ships heading to Europe. Additionally, there were overland caravan routes from the East that would have been carrying the disease into Europe as well.

Kaffa eventually recovered. The thriving, culturally diverse city and its thronged slave market have been described by the Spanish traveler Pedro Tafur, who was there in the 1430s. In 1462 Caffa placed itself under the protection of King Casimir IV of Poland. However, Poland did not offer significant help due to reinforcements sent being massacred in Bar fortress (modern day Ukraine) by Duke Czartoryski after a quarrel with locals.

Kefe (Ottoman)

Following the fall of Constantinople, Amasra, and lastly Trebizond, the position of Caffa had become untenable and attracted the attention of Ottoman Sultan Mehmed II. He was at no loss for a pretext to extinguish this last Genoese colony on the Black Sea. In 1473, the tudun (or governor) of the Crimean Khanate died and a fight developed over the appointment of his successor. The Genoese involved themselves in the dispute, and the Tatar notables who favored the losing candidate finally asked Mehmed to settle the dispute. Mehmed dispatched a fleet under the Ottoman commander Gedik Ahmet Pasha, which left Constantinople 19 May 1475. It anchored before the walls of the city on 1 June, started the bombardment the next day, and on 6 June the inhabitants capitulated. Over the next few days the Ottomans proceeded to extract the wealth of the inhabitants, and abduct 1,500 youths for service in the Sultan's palace. On 8 July the final blow was struck when all inhabitants of Latin origin were ordered to relocate to Istanbul, where they founded a quarter (Kefeli Mahalle) which was named after the town they had been forced to leave. Renamed Kefe, Caffa became one of the most important Turkish ports on the Black Sea.

In 1615 Zaporozhian Cossacks under the leadership of Petro Konashevych-Sahaidachny destroyed the Turkish fleet and captured Caffa. Having conquered the city, the Cossacks released the men, women and children who were slaves.

Feodosia (Russian Empire)

Ottoman control ceased when the expanding Russian Empire took over Crimea between 1774 and 1783. It was renamed Feodosia (Russian Ѳеодосія; reformed spelling Феодосия), after the traditional Russian reading of its ancient Greek name. In 1900 Zibold constructed the first air well (dew condenser) on mount Tepe-Oba near Feodosia.

Soviet Union

WWII and Holocaust
The city was occupied by the forces of Nazi Germany during World War II, sustaining significant damage in the process. The Jewish population numbering 3,248 before the German occupation was murdered by SD-Einsatzgruppe D between November 16 and December 15, 1941. A witness interviewed by the Soviet Extraordinary Commission in 1944 and quoted on the website of the French organization Yahad-In Unum described how the Jews were rounded-up in the city: [A]ll the Jews were gathered. The Germans told them they would be displaced somewhere in Ukraine. On December 4, 1941, in the morning, all the Jews, including my father, my mother and my sister were taken to an anti-tank trench where they were executed by German shooters. 1,500-1,700 people were shot that day. A monument commemorating the Holocaust victims is situated at the crossroads of Kerchensky and Symferopolsky highways. On Passover eve, April 7, 2012, unknown persons desecrated, for the sixth time, the monument, allegedly as an anti-Semitic act.

All native Tatar inhabitants were arrested by Soviet forces as several thousand Tatars had fought side-by-side with the Nazis against Soviet forces and had participated in the Jewish genocide. Following Stalin's orders, all Tatars were sent to Kazakhstan, Uzbekistan and other Central Asian republics of the USSR.

Geography

Climate
The climate is warm and dry and could be described as humid subtropical, but not as Mediterranean, because the drying summer trend is not pronounced enough.

Modern Feodosia

Modern Feodosia is a resort city with a population of about 69,000 people. It has beaches, mineral springs, and mud baths, sanatoria, and rest homes. Apart from tourism, its economy rests on agriculture and fisheries. Local industries include fishing, brewing and canning. As with much of the Crimea, most of its population is ethnically Russian; the Ukrainian language is infrequently used. In June 2006, Feodosia made the news with the 2006 anti-NATO protests.

While most beaches in the Crimea are made of pebbles, in the Feodosia area there is a unique Golden Beach (Zolotoy Plyazh) made of small seashells which stretches for some 15 km.

The city is sparsely populated during the winter months and most cafes and restaurants are closed. Business and tourism increase in mid-June and peak during July and August. As in the other resort towns of the Crimea, the tourists come mostly from the C.I.S. countries of the former Soviet Union. 

Feodosia was the city where the seascape painter Ivan Aivazovsky lived and worked all his life, and where general Pyotr Kotlyarevsky and the writer Alexander Grin spent their declining years. Popular tourist locations include the Aivazovsky National Art Gallery and the Genoese fortress.

Economy and industry
More PO (Primorsk)
Sudokompozit - ship design R&D naval hardware
 Kasatka TsNII Gp NPO Uran (Gagra Pitsunda) - ship design R&D naval hardware
Gidropribor FeOMMZ, torpedo manufacturing and ship yard (Ordzhonikidze)
 NPO Uran TsNII Gp "Kasatka" (Lab N°5 NII400) torpedoes (Gagra Pitsunda)
Russia Black Sea Fleet Navy Ship repair Yards
FOMZ Opto Mechanical Plant FKOZ
Feodosia Economic Industrial Zone FPZ (west)
Feodosia FMZ Engineering/Machine-building Plant
Feodosia FPZ (Priborostroeni Priladobudivni) Instrument-making Plant

Twin towns—sister cities
 Armavir, Armenia
 Azov, Russia
 Kronstadt, Russia
 Stavropol, Russia
 Kołobrzeg, Poland
and others

People from Feodosia
Ivan Aivazovsky (1817-1900), Russian painter
Roman Kapitonenko (born 1981), Ukrainian boxer
Wolff Kostakowsky (1879-1944), American klezmer violinist
Andrzej Liczik (born 1977), Ukrainian-Polish boxer

In popular culture
The late-medieval city of Caffa is the location of a section of the novel Caprice and Rondo by Dorothy Dunnett.

An early 14th-century bishop of Caffa appears in Umberto Eco's novel The Name of the Rose, making several sharp replies in a long, tempestuous debate within a group of monks and clerics; he is portrayed as aggressive and somewhat narrow-minded.

See also
 List of traditional Greek place names

References

Further reading
 
 
 Гавриленко О. А., Сівальньов О. М., Цибулькін В. В. Генуезька спадщина на теренах України; етнодержавознавчий вимір. — Харків: Точка, 2017.— 260 с. — 
 Khvalkov E. The colonies of Genoa in the Black Sea region: evolution and transformation. L., New York : Routledge, 2017
 Khvalkov E. Evoluzione della struttura della migrazione dei liguri e dei corsi nelle colonie genovesi tra Trecento e Quattrocento. In: Atti della Società Ligure di Storia Patria, Nuova Serie'. 2017. Vol. 57 / 131 . -pp. 67–79.
 Khvalkov E. I piemontesi nelle colonie genovesi sul Mar Nero: popolazione del Piemonte a Caffa secondo i dati delle Massariae Caffae ad annum del 1423 e del 1461. In: Studi Piemontesi. 2017. No. 2. pp. 623–628.
 Khvalkov E. Campania, Puglia e Basilicata nella colonizzazione genovese dell'Oltremare nei secoli XIV – XV: Caffa genovese secondo i dati dei libri contabili. In: Rassegna Storica Salernitana. 2016. Vol. 65. pp. 11–16.
 Khvalkov E. Italia settentrionale e centrale nel progetto coloniale genovese sul Mar Nero: gente di Padania e Toscana a Caffa genovese nei secoli XIII – XV secondo i dati delle Massariae Caffae ad annum 1423 e 1461. In: Studi veneziani. Vol. LXXIII, 2016. - pp. 237–240.
 Khvalkov E. Il progetto coloniale genovese sul Mar Nero, la dinamica della migrazione latina a Caffa e la gente catalanoaragonese, siciliana e sarda nel Medio Evo. In: Archivio Storico Sardo. 2015. Vol. 50. No. 1. pp. 265–279.
 Khvalkov E. Il Mezzogiorno italiano nella colonizzazione genovese del Mar Nero a Caffa genovese nei secoli XIII – XV (secondo i dati delle Massariae Caffae) (pdf). In: Archivio Storico Messinese. 2015. Vol. 96 . - pp. 7-11.

External links

WorldStatesmen- Ukraine
Ancient Theodosia and its Coinage
Tourist Theodosius
The murder of the Jews of Feodosia during World War II, at Yad Vashem website.

Feodosia Municipality
Bosporan Kingdom
Cities in Crimea
Feodosiysky Uyezd
Former populated places in Eastern Europe
Greek colonies in Crimea
Khazar towns
Milesian colonies in Crimea
Populated places established in the 6th century BC
Seaside resorts in Russia
Seaside resorts in Ukraine
Territories of the Republic of Genoa
Territories of the Republic of Venice
Port cities and towns in Russia
Port cities and towns in Ukraine
Port cities of the Black Sea
Cities of regional significance in Ukraine
Holocaust locations in Ukraine
Fiefdoms of Poland